Nicolai Halby Wammen (born 7 February 1971, in Holbæk) is a Danish politician of the Social Democrats who has been serving as Minister for Finance in the government of Prime Minister Mette Frederiksen since 2019. A native and lifelong resident of Denmark's second-largest city, Aarhus, he served as mayor. On the national level, he has served as Minister of European Affairs (2011–2013) and as Minister of Defence (2013–2015).

Political career
While studying, Wammen became the chairman of the university’s Social Democrat organisation, Frit Forum., and was first elected to the Aarhus City Council in 1998. In the 2001 elections, he was elected to Parliament and served one term. After almost a full term as the party’s shadow finance minister, he pulled out of national politics and was then elected Mayor of Aarhus in 2006. At this time he was also elected vice president of the Social Democrats.

When Helle Thorning-Schmidt led the Social Democrats to victory in Denmark's 2011 elections, Wammen returned to Danish Parliament (representing Aarhus), securing the fifth-highest number of personal votes. He was appointed to the newly created position of Minister of European Affairs in the cabinet of Prime Minister Helle Thorning-Schmidt; he held the office from October 2011 to August 2013. In this capacity, he chaired the meetings of the General Affairs Council when Denmark held the rotating presidency of the Council of the European Union in 2012.

On 9 August 2013, Prime Minister Thorning-Schmidt announced her first cabinet reshuffle, changing six ministers, including moving Nicolai Wammen to Minister for Defence, and moving Minister of Defence Nick Hækkerup to Minister of European Affairs and Trade.

Personal life
After a year and a half studying law, Wammen switched to political science, and earned a master's degree from the University of Aarhus in 2001.

Wammen is currently married to Karen Lund, and was formerly engaged with Mai Mercado, and Kirsten Brosbøl.

In 2011 Danish newspaper Ekstra Bladet reported that Wammen fathered a son, Carl, (born 9 October 2011) with Julie Rademacher, a former member of the Parliament whom the paper described as "a friend". Upon the birth of their son, she resigned from Parliament and moved to Greenland to be with her parents.

References

External links
 Nicolai Wammen's website
 

1971 births
Living people
People from Holbæk Municipality
Mayors of places in Denmark
Aarhus University alumni
Social Democrats (Denmark) politicians
Government ministers of Denmark
Danish Defence Ministers
Danish Finance Ministers
Danish municipal councillors
Members of the Folketing 2001–2005
Members of the Folketing 2011–2015
Members of the Folketing 2015–2019
Members of the Folketing 2019–2022
Members of the Folketing 2022–2026